Manoj Chakraborty is an Indian politician and was Minister of State for Parliamentary Affairs in the Government of West Bengal. He is also an MLA, elected from the Baharampur constituency in the 2011 West Bengal state assembly election.

Manoj Chakraborty resigned from the state cabinet on 18 January 2012.

Manoj Chakraborty shot into prominence when in the 2006 state assembly elections as an independent he won the Berhampore assembly seat defeating his nearest rival Amal Karmakar of RSP. Manoj Chakraborty, contesting as an independent, was a rebel Congress candidate put up by Adhir Choudhury as a protest against the official Congress candidate Maya Rani Paul.

References 

State cabinet ministers of West Bengal
Living people
West Bengal MLAs 2011–2016
Indian National Congress politicians from West Bengal
People from Baharampur
1954 births
West Bengal MLAs 2016–2021